Ichiko Hashimoto is the name of:

Ichiko Hashimoto (musician) (born 1952), Japanese jazz pianist, composer and singer
Ichiko Hashimoto (born 1972?), singer who was part of the group Aurora Gonin Musume